Yoddha: The Warrior is a 2014  Indian Bengali-language fantasy action film directed by Raj Chakraborty. It is a remake of 2009 Telugu film Magadheera. In the film, Dev and Raj Chakraborty return as actor-director duo after Dui Prithibi. It was produced by Shree Venkatesh Films, and was released on 1 October 2014, during the Durga Puja. It received mostly negative reviews and was considered a failure.

Cast 
 Dev as Rudrapratap/Abir (dual role)
 Mimi Chakraborty as Rajkumari Durga/Nandini (Daughter of the king)
 Nigel Akkara as Raghav Choudhury/Ranabir
 Rajatava Dutta as Abu Hossain/Ali Bhai
 Hektor Sandhu
 Kanchan Mullick as Abir's friend
 Supriyo Dutta as Shonku
 Rajesh kr Chattopadhyay
 Nusrat Jahan as special dancer in "Desi Chhori" Song
 Barun Chanda as the king of Sundargarh
 Mrinal Mukherjee as Ramlatan Choudhury, father of Raghav/ Ranabir
 Pradip Dhar
 Prasun Gain
 Shantilal Mukherjee

Soundtrack 

The soundtrack of the film was scored by Indraadip Dasgupta and Savvy.

Release and reception 
It was released on 1 October, during the time of Durga Puja. It received mostly negative reviews and was considered a disaster.

World television premiere 
The film had its world television premiere on Star Jalsha on 25 January 2015 on 6:00 pm I.S.T.

References

External links

2014 films
2010s fantasy action films
2014 romantic drama films
Films about reincarnation
Films scored by Savvy Gupta
Films scored by Indradeep Dasgupta
Indian romantic action films
Indian fantasy action films
Bengali-language Indian films
2010s Bengali-language films
Bengali remakes of Telugu films
Films directed by Raj Chakraborty